Charles Marshall may refer to:

Science
 Charles Marshall (Quaker) (1637–1698), British physician and mystic
 Charles Robertson Marshall, British physician
 Charles R. Marshall, Australian paleobiologist
 Charles E. Marshall, American microbiologist of Marshall Hall

Sports
 Charles Marshall (cricketer, born 1842) (1842–1925), English cricketer for Cambridgeshire
 Charles Marshall (Middlesex cricketer) (1843–1904), English cricketer Middlesex and Cambridgeshire
 Charles Marshall (Surrey cricketer) (1863–1948), English cricketer
 Charlie Marshall (cricketer) (born 1961), Bermudian cricketer
 Charlie Marshall (rugby union) (1886–1947), British rugby union player
 Chip Marshall (baseball) (Charles Anthony Marshall, 1919–2007), catcher in Major League Baseball
 Charles Marshall (cyclist) (1901–1973), British Olympic cyclist

Others
 Charles Marshall (painter) (1806–1890), English scene-painter
 Charles Marshall (colonel) (1830–1902), Confederate army officer during the American Civil War
 Charles Henry Tilson Marshall (1841–1927), British Army officer and ornithologist
 Charles Marshall (judge) (1788–1873), Chief Justice of British Ceylon
 Charles A. Marshall (1898–1985), American cinematographer
 Charles Henry Marshall (1834–1906), American businessman, art collector and philanthropist
 Charles Marshall (engineer) (1864–1953), Australian inventor of the Marshalite rotary traffic signal
 Charles Marshall, British composer of popular songs: e.g. "I Hear You Calling Me"
 Charles Marshall, comics writer; see Alien Nation

Ships
 Charles H. Marshall (pilot boat), 19th century New York pilot boat
 Charles H. Marshall (ship), an American packet ship, built 1869
 SS Charles H. Marshall, a Liberty ship, built 1944